He Reigns: The Worship Collection is the second major compilation album for the Christian rock group Newsboys.  After the group left Sparrow Records, the label decided to release a new compilation album.  While their first compilation Shine: The Hits covered their best-known songs, He Reigns: The Worship Collection covered the softer, more "inspirational" songs in the latter part of the group's career (from 1999's Love Liberty Disco album to their most recent set, Devotion) leaving off some of their most well-known "pop" songs (most notably "Love Liberty Disco", "Good Stuff," "Joy", "Who?" and "Million Pieces (Kissin' Your Cares Goodbye)") released during this time period.

Track listing

Personnel
Peter Furler – lead vocals, drums, guitar on all tracks
Phil Joel – vocals, bass guitar, guitars on all tracks
Jody Davis – vocals, lead/rhythm guitars, bass on tracks 1–3, 7–8, and 10
Jeff Frankenstein – keys, vocals on all tracks
Duncan Phillips – drums, percussion
Bryan Olesen – guitars, vocals on tracks 4–6, 9, and 11
Rebecca St. James – vocals on Blessed Be Your Name

References 

Newsboys compilation albums
2005 compilation albums